Read's Drug Store was a chain of stores based in Baltimore, Maryland. Read's Drug Store was founded by William Read. He sold it to the Nattans family in 1899.  The downtown store was constructed in 1934 by Smith & May, Baltimore architects also responsible for the Bank of America building at 10 Light St.  In 1929, one company slogan was "Run Right to Reads." Read's was purchased from the Nattans by Rite Aid in 1983.

The downtown store was the site of an early sit-in during the Civil Rights Movement. Read's downtown Baltimore location has since closed, leaving behind an empty building. There is currently a controversy over whether to raze this building for development or preserve it and turn it into a civil rights museum.

Desegregation
The Read's store in downtown Baltimore (at Lexington St. and Howard St.) was the site of one of the country's first anti-segregation sit-ins. Students at Morgan State University joined up with a local chapter of the Congress on Racial Equality (CORE) to conduct a demonstration on January 20, 1955. The event was peaceful and lasted for only half an hour. According to Dr. Helena Hicks, a participant in the protest and now a commissioner on the Baltimore City Commission for Historical and Architectural Preservation, the protest consisted of seven people who decided mostly spontaneously to enter the drug store. The NAACP confirmed that this was the first sit-in of its kind. 

Two days later, the store was officially desegregated. Arthur Nattans, Sr., then President of Read's, ran an announcement in the Baltimore Afro-American stating “We will serve all customers throughout our entire stores, including the fountains, and this becomes effective immediately.” 

The relationship between protestors and store was not entirely combative. Ben Everinghim, a vice chairman of CORE in charge of negotiations with Read's, stated: "We feel that Read's management has been understanding and cooperative and we wish especially to compliment them and congratulate them at this time when they have been instrumental in the elimination of discrimination in such wide areas of the city."

Historic Preservation Controversy
In 2011, the Baltimore Commission for Historical and Architectural Preservation voted to grant temporary landmark status to the downtown store. This decision blocked the plan by Mayor Stephanie Rawlings-Blake and Lexington Square Partners to build a $150 million development on the site. The developers initially planned to raze the building but had later agreed to preserve two walls; preservationists argued that both plans were insufficient.

Activists want the building preserved and turned into a civil rights museum. They accuse the city of "demolition by neglect": avoiding minor repairs and allowing the building to collapse in order to make room for development.

Support for preserving the building comes from Baltimore Heritage, a non-profit historical preservation group, and the Jewish Museum of Maryland, which celebrates the Nattans' decision to desegregate early.

See also
 Sit-in movement
 1957 Royal Ice Cream Sit-in, occurred in Durham, North Carolina
 1958 Dockum Drug Store sit-in, occurred in Wichita, Kansas
 1958 Oklahoma City sit-ins, occurred in Oklahoma City, Oklahoma
 1960 Greensboro sit-ins, occurred in Greensboro, North Carolina
 1960 Nashville sit-ins, occurred in Nashville, Tennessee

References

Rite Aid
Companies based in Baltimore
Defunct pharmacies of the United States
Buildings and structures in Baltimore
Retail companies established in 1899